Jian Xin Xu was a Chinese-born Singaporean professor at the National University of Singapore (NUS) Department of Electrical and Computer Engineering. His research interests included robotics, learning theory, and control theory.

Xu received his bachelor's degree in electrical engineering from Zhejiang University in 1982, and then moved to Japan where he completed his master's (1986) and Ph.D. (1989) at the University of Tokyo in the same field. Following that, he worked for Hitachi Research Laboratories for a year, and was then a visiting research fellow at the University of Ohio and a visiting scholar at Yale University, before joining the NUS faculty in 1991. He was named Fellow of the Institute of Electrical and Electronics Engineers (IEEE) in 2012 "for contributions to motion control systems".

References

20th-century births
Living people
Fellow Members of the IEEE
University of Tokyo alumni
Zhejiang University alumni
Academic staff of the National University of Singapore
Year of birth missing (living people)
Place of birth missing (living people)